Victoires de la Musique is an annual French award ceremony where the Victoire accolade is delivered by the French Ministry of Culture to recognize outstanding achievement in the music industry. The classical and jazz versions are the Victoires de la musique classique and Victoires du Jazz.

The annual presentation ceremony features performances by prominent artists, some of the awards of more popular interest are presented in a widely viewed televised ceremony. The awards are the French equivalent to the Grammy Awards and the Brit Awards for music, and it is one of the major awards in France, along with Nuits des Molières for stage performances, and the César Award for motion pictures.

The first Victoires de la Musique ceremony was held in 1985, and it was set up to honor musical accomplishments by performers for the year 1985.

Background
The title trophies and nominees for each are established annually by the Board of Directors of the Association "Les Victoires de la Musique", which also refers to people who make up the Academy voters. In 2010, the Victoires were awarded by a panel of 1 226 professionals (musicians, artists, writers, composers, producers, record stores, video directors, sound engineers and critics) in a vote in one round. Of the voters, 40% are artists (performers, but also musicians, writers, composers ...), 40% are professional music producers and 20% are of other professional circles close to the world of music (agents artists, music stores, music critics, radio programmers ...).
In recent years, some trophies are awarded by the public, through SMS voting, and since 2009, Internet: Victory "Group or Artist of the public revelation of the year" and that the "Song of the year".

Categories

Group of the Year 
(Starting 2001, replaced by Male Group or Artist of the Year / Female Group or Artist of the Year)
1988 : Kassav'
1990 : Gipsy Kings
1991 : Elmer Food Beat
1992 : MC Solaar
1993 : Pow woW
1994 : Les Innocents
1995 : IAM
1996 : Les Innocents (second award)
1997 : Les Innocents (third award)
1998 : Noir Désir
1999 : Louise Attaque
2000 : Zebda

Male Artist of the Year 
1985 : Michel Jonasz
1986 : Jean-Jacques Goldman
1987 : Johnny Hallyday
1988 : Claude Nougaro
1990 : Francis Cabrel
1991 : Michel Sardou
1992 : Patrick Bruel
1993 : Alain Bashung 
1994 : Alain Souchon
1995 : MC Solaar
1996 : Maxime Le Forestier
1997 : Charles Aznavour
1998 : Florent Pagny
1999 : Alain Bashung (second award)
2000 : -M-

Male Group or Artist of the Year 
(Replacing Male Artist of the Year and Group of the Year)
2001 : Henri Salvador
2002 : Gérald De Palmas
2003 : Renaud
2004 : Calogero
2005 : -M- (second award)
2006 : Raphael
2007 : Bénabar
2008 : Abd Al Malik
2009 : Alain Bashung (third award)
2010 : Benjamin Biolay
2011 : Gaëtan Roussel
2012 : Hubert-Félix Thiéfaine
2013 : Dominique A
2014 : Stromae
2015 : Julien Doré
2016 : Vianney
2017 : Renaud (2nd award)
2018 : Orelsan
2019 : Bigflo & Oli

Female Artist of the Year 
1985 : Jeanne Mas
1986 : Catherine Lara
1987 : France Gall
1988 : Mylène Farmer
1990 : Vanessa Paradis
1991 : Patricia Kaas
1992 : Jane Birkin
1993 : Véronique Sanson
1994 : Barbara 
1995 : Celine Dion
1996 : Véronique Sanson (second award)
1997 : Barbara (second award)
1998 : Zazie 
1999 : Axelle Red 
2000 : Natacha Atlas

Female Group or Artist of the Year 
(Replacing Female Artist of the Year and Group of the Year)
2001 : Hélène Ségara 
2002 : Zazie (second award)
2003 : Lynda Lemay
2004 : Carla Bruni
2005 : Françoise Hardy
2006 : Juliette
2007 : Olivia Ruiz
2008 : Vanessa Paradis (second award)
2009 : Camille
2010 : Olivia Ruiz (second award)
2011 : Aṣa
2012 : Catherine Ringer
2013 : Lou Doillon
2014 : Vanessa Paradis (third award)
2015 : Christine and the Queens
2016 : Yael Naim
2017 : Jain
2018 : Charlotte Gainsbourg
2019 : Jeanne Added

Foreign Artist of the Year
1985 : Tina Turner (United States)

Francophone Artist or Artist of the Year 
1994 : Maurane (Belgium)
1995 : Khaled (Algeria)
1996 : Céline Dion (Canada)
1997 : Teri Moïse (United States / Haiti)

Electronic/Dance Artist of the Year 
2009 : Martin Solveig
2010 : Birdy Nam Nam
2011 : Stromae

Révélation (Newcomer)

Popular Music Révélation of the Year
1985 : Jeanne Mas
1986 : Gold

Popular Music Female Révélation of the Year
1987 : Guesch Patti
1988 : Patricia Kaas
1990 : Corinne Hermès
1991 : Liane Foly
1992 : Jil Caplan
1993 : Zazie
1994 : Nina Morato
1995 : Rachel Des Bois
1996 : Stephend

Popular Music Male Révélation of the Year
1987 : L'Affaire Louis Trio
1988 : Florent Pagny
1990 : Philippe Lafontaine
1991 : Art Mengo
1992 : Nilda Fernandez
1993 : Arthur H
1994 : Thomas Fersen
1995 : Gérald de Palmas
1996 : Ménélik

Group Révélation of the Year
1994 : Native
1995 : Sinclair
1996 : Alliance Ethnik

Révélation of the Year
(Starting 1997 until 2004, replacing three categories Female Révélation of the Year, Male Révélation of the Year and Group Révélation of the Year)
(Starting 2005, replaced by Group or Artist Popular Révélation of the Year)
1997 : Juliette
1998 : Lara Fabian
1999 : Faudel
2000 : 113
2001 : Isabelle Boulay
2002 : Aston Villa
2003 : Natasha Saint-Pier
2004 : Kyo

Group or Artist Popular Révélation of the Year
(Replacing Révélation of the Year)
2005 : Jeanne Cherhal
2006 : Amel Bent
2007 : Miss Dominique
2008 : Christophe Maé
2009 : Sefyu
2010 : Pony Pony Run Run
2011 : Lilly Wood and the Prick
2012 : Orelsan
2013 : C2C
(Discontinued starting 2014)

Group or Artist Stage Révélation of the Year
2001 : Saint-Germain
2002 : Le Peuple de l'Herbe
2003 : Sanseverino
2004 : Kyo
2005 : La Grande Sophie
2006 : Camille
2007 : Grand Corps Malade
2008 : Renan Luce
2009 : BB Brunes
2010 : Izia
2011 : Ben l'Oncle Soul
2012 : Brigitte
2013 : C2C
2014 : Woodkid
2015 : Benjamin Clementine
2016 : Hyphen Hyphen
2017 : L.E.J
2018 : Gaël Faye
2019 : Clara Luciani

Album Révélation of the Year
2001 : Mieux qu'ici bas by Isabelle Boulay
2002 : Rose Kennedy by Benjamin Biolay
2003 : Vincent Delerm by Vincent Delerm
2004 : Le Chemin by Kyo
2005 : Crèvecœur by Daniel Darc and Le rêve ou la vie by Ridan
2006 : Le Fil by Camille
2007 : Midi 20 by Grand Corps Malade
2008 : Repenti by Renan Luce
2009 : Ersatz by Julien Doré
2010 : Tree of Life by Yodelice
*Discontinued for period 2011 to 2013
2014 : Psycho Tropical Berlin by La Femme
2015 : Mini World by Indila
2016 : Chambre 12 by Louane
2017 : Les Conquêtes by Radio Elvis
2018 : Petite Amie by Juliette Armanet
2019 : Brol by Angèle

Album of the Year

Album of the Year
1985 : Love on the Beat by Serge Gainsbourg
1986 : Sauver l'amour by Daniel Balavoine
1987 : The No Comprendo by Rita Mitsouko
1988 : Nougayork by Claude Nougaro
1990 : Sarbacane by Francis Cabrel
1991 : Nickel by Alain Souchon
1992 : Sheller en solitaire by William Sheller
1993 : Caché derrière by Laurent Voulzy
1994 :  Rio Grande by Eddy Mitchell
1995 : Samedi soir sur la Terre by Francis Cabrel
1996 : Défoule sentimentale by Alain Souchon
1997 : Mr Eddy by Eddy Mitchell
1998 : L'École du micro d'argent by IAM
*Discontinued and replaced by Song/Variety Album of the Year and Rock Album of the Year

Song/Variety Album of the Year
1999 : Fantaisie Militaire by Alain Bashung (as Variety, Pop, Rock Album of the Year)
2000 : Sang pour sang by Johnny Hallyday (as Variety, Pop, Rock Album of the Year)
2001 : Chambre avec vue by Henri Salvador
2002 : Avril by Laurent Voulzy
2003 : Boucan d'enfer by Renaud
2004 : Les Risques du Métier by Bénabar 
2005 : Qui de nous deux by -M-
2006 : Caravane by Raphael
2007 : Le soldat rose by Louis Chedid
2008 : Divinidylle by Vanessa Paradis
2009 : Bleu pétrole by Alain Bashung
2010 : La Superbe by Benjamin Biolay
2011 : Causes perdues et musiques tropicales by Bernard Lavilliers
2012 : Suppléments de mensonge by Hubert-Félix Thiéfaine
2013 : La place du fantôme by La Grande Sophie
2014 : Racine carrée (stylised as √) by Stromae
2015 : Alain Souchon & Laurent Voulzy by Alain Souchon & Laurent Voulzy
2016 : De l'amour by Johnny Hallyday
2017 : Palermo Hollywood by Benjamin Biolay
2018 : Géopoétique by MC Solaar
2019 : En amont by Alain Bashung

Rock Album of the Year
1985 : Un autre monde by Téléphone
1986 : Passé le Rio Grande by Alain Bashung
*Discontinued from 1987, returned in 2001
2001 : Comme on a dit by Louise Attaque
2002 : des Visages des Figures by Noir Désir
2003 : Paradize by Indochine
2004 : Tu vas pas mourir de rire by Mickey 3D
2005 : French bazaar by Arno
2006 : À plus tard crocodile by Louise Attaque (second award)
2007 : Wow by Superbus
2008 : L'Invitation by Étienne Daho
2009 : L'Homme du monde by Arthur H
2010 : Izia by Izia
2011 : Ginger by Gaëtan Roussel
2012 : So Much Trouble by Izia (second award)
2013 : Can Be Late by Skip the Use
2014 : Bankrupt! by Phoenix
2015 : Shake, Shook, Shaken! by The Dø
2016 : Mandarine by Les Innocents
2017 : Anomalie by Louise Attaque (third award)
2018 : The Evol by Shaka Ponk
2019 : Radiate by Jeanne Added

Francophone Album of the Year
1985 : Ils s'aiment by Daniel Lavoie (Canada)
1986 : Faire à nouveau connaissance by Diane Tell (Canada)
1987 : Vue sur la mer by Daniel Lavoie (Canada) (second award)
1988 : Awaba Beach by Mory Kante (Guinea)
1990 : Hélène by Roch Voisine (Canada)
1991 : Double by Roch Voisine (Canada) (second award)
1992 : Engelberg by Stephan Eicher (Switzerland)

Pop/Rock Album of the Year
2003 : Paradize by Indochine
2004 : Tu vas pas mourir de rire by Mickey 3D
2005 : French bazaar by Arno Hintjens
2006 : A plus tard crocodile by Louise Attaque
2007 : Wow by Superbus
2008 : L'Invitation by Etienne Daho
2009 : L'Homme du monde by Arthur H
2010 : Izia by Izia

Traditional or World Music 
Traditional Music Album of the Year
1992 : Nouvelles polyphonies corses
1994 : Renaud cante el Nord by Renaud
1995 : Polyphonies by Voce Di Corsica
1996 : Dan Ar Braz et les 50 musiciens de l'Héritage des Celtes en concert by Dan Ar Braz and l'Héritage des Celtes
1997 : I Muvrini à Bercy by I Muvrini

Traditional Music/World Music Album of the Year
1998 : Finisterres by Dan Ar Braz and l'Héritage des Celtes
1999 : Clandestino by Manu Chao
2000 : Café Atlántico by Cesária Évora
2001 : Made in Medina by Rachid Taha
2002 : Proxima estación? Esperanza by Manu Chao
2003 : Umani by I Muvrini tied with Françafrique by Tiken Jah Fakoly
2004 : Voz d'amor by Cesária Évora
2005 : Dimanche à Bamako by Amadou & Mariam

World Music Album of the Year
2006 : Mesk Elil by Souad Massi
2007 : Canta by Agnès Jaoui
2008 : Yael Naim by Yael Naïm
2009 : Tchamantché by Rokia Traoré
2010 : La Différence by Salif Keita
2011 : Handmade by Hindi Zahra
2012 : Cantina Paradise by Jehro
2013 : Folila by Amadou & Mariam
2014 : Illusions by Ibrahim Maalouf
2015 : Rivière noire by Rivière noire
2016 : Homeland by Hindi Zahra
2017 : Far From Home by Calypso Rose
2018 : Lamomali by Lamomali (-M-, Toumani Diabaté, Sidiki Diabaté, Fatoumata Diawara)
2019 : LOST by Camélia Jordana

Urban music (various)
1999 : Panique celtique by Manau (as Rap/Groove Album of the Year)
2000 : Les Princes de la ville by 113 (as Rap, Reggae or Groove Album of the Year)
2001 : J'fais c'que j'veux by Pierpoljak (as Rap, Reggae or Groove Album of the Year)
2002 : X raisons by Saïan Supa Crew (as Rap/Hip-Hop Album of the Year)
2003 : Solitaire by Doc Gynéco (as Rap/Hip-Hop Album of the Year)
2004 : Brut de femme by Diam's (as Rap/Hip-Hop Album of the Year)
2005 : 16/9 by Nâdiya (as Rap/Hip-Hop/R&B Album of the Year)
2006 : Les Histoires extraordinaires d'un jeune de banlieue - Disiz la Peste (as Rap/Ragga/Hip-Hop/R&B Album of the Year)

Urban Music Album of the Year
2007 : Gibraltar by Abd Al Malik
2008 : Chapitre 7 by MC Solaar
2009 : Dante by Abd Al Malik
2010 : L'arme de paix by Oxmo Puccino
2011 : Château Rouge by Abd Al Malik
2012 : Le Chant des sirènes by Orelsan
2013 : Roi sans carrosse by Oxmo Puccino
2014 : Paris Sud Minute by 1995
2015 : Je suis en vie by Akhenaton
2016 : Feu by Nekfeu
2017 : My World by Jul
2018 : La fête est finie by Orelsan (second award)
2019 : La vie de rêve by Bigflo & Oli

Reggae/Ragga (various)
2002 : The Real Don by Lord Kossity (as Reggae/Ragga Album of the Year)
2003 : Umani by I Muvrini and Francafrique by Tiken Jah Fakoly (as Reggae/Ragga/World Music Album of the Year)
2004 : Voz d'amor de Cesária Évora (as Reggae/Ragga/World Music Album of the Year)
2005 : Dimanche à Bamako by Amadou et Mariam (as Reggae/Ragga/World Music Album of the Year)

Electronic/Groove/Dance Album of the Year
1998 : 30 by Laurent Garnier
1999 : Moon Safari  by Air
2000 : Trabendo by Les Négresses Vertes
2001 : Tourist by Saint-Germain
2002 : Modjo by Modjo
2003 : La Revancha del Tango by Gotan Project
2004 : Émilie Simon by Émilie Simon
2005 : Talkie Walkie by Air
2006 : Animal sophistiqué by Bumcello
2007 : Végétal by Émilie Simon
2008 : † by Justice
2010 : Manual For Successful Rioting by Birdy Nam Nam
2011 : Cheese by Stromae
2012 : Audio, Video, Disco by Justice
2013 : Tetra by C2C
2014 : OutRun by Kavinsky
2015 : Ghost Surfer by Cascadeur
2016 : The Wanderings of the Avener by The Avener
2017 : Layers by Kungs
2018 : Temperance by Dominique Dalcan
2019 : Dancehall by The Blaze

Variety/Instrumental Album of the Year
1985 : Zoolook by Jean Michel Jarre
1986 : Rendez-vous by Jean Michel Jarre (second award)
1992 : Explorer by Jean-Jacques Milteau
1993 : Négropolitaines Vol. 2 by Manu Dibango
1994 : Cross over USA by Claude Bolling
1995 : Jonasz en noires et blanches by Jean-Yves D'Angelo
1996 : Les Parapluies de Cherbourg, Summer of '42 (Un été 42), Yentl and The Go-Between (Le Messager) by Michel Legrand

Album of the Year for Children
1985 : Les Petits Ewoks by Dorothée
1987 : Histoires pour les 4/5 ans by Jean Rochefort
Discontinued 1988 to 1990
1991 : La Petite Sirène told by Nathalie Baye
1992 : Pierre et le Loup de Prokofiev by Julien Clerc
1993 : Pierre et le Loup de Prokofiev recited by Lambert Wilson
1994 : Aladin et la Lampe merveilleuse recited by Sabine Azéma
1995 : L'Évasion de Toni by Henri Dès and Pierre Grosz
1997 : Far West by Henri Dès (second award)
1999 : Émilie Jolie (2nd version) by Philippe Chatel
2001 : Du soleil by Henri Dès (third award)

Original Cinema/Television Soundtrack of the Year
1985 : Subway - Éric Serra
1986 : 37°2 le Matin - Gabriel Yared
1987 : Manon des Sources - Jean-Claude Petit
1988 : Le Grand Bleu - Éric Serra
1990 : Camille Claudel - Gabriel Yared
1991 : Cyrano de Bergerac - Jean-Claude Petit
1992 : Delicatessen - Carlos D'Alession
1993 : L'Amant - Gabriel Yared
1994 : L'Ecrivain public - William Sheller
1995 : Léon - Éric Serra
1996 : Un indien dans la ville - K.O.D.
1997 : Microcosmos, le Peuple de l'Herbe - Bruno Coulais
1998 : Le Patient Anglais - Gabriel Yared
1999 : Taxi - Akhénaton / Khéops
2000 : Ma Petite Entreprise - Alain Bashung
2001 : The Virgin Suicides - Air
2002 : Le Fabuleux Destin d'Amélie Poulain - Yann Tiersen
2004 : Good Bye Lenin! - Yann Tiersen
2005 : Les Choristes - Bruno Coulais / Christophe Barratier / Philippe Lopes Curval
2006 : March of the Penguins - Émilie Simon
2007 : Ne le dis à personne - -M-
2008 : Arthur et les Minimoys - Éric Serra

Song of the Year
1985 : "La Boîte de Jazz" (writer/composer/performer: Michel Jonasz)
1986 : "Belle-île en mer" (composer/performer: Laurent Voulzy - lyricist: Alain Souchon)
1987 : "Musulmanes" (author/performer: Michel Sardou - lyrics: Jacques Revaux and Jean-Pierre Bourtayre)
1988 : "Né quelque part" (lyrics/performer: Maxime Le Forestier - composer: Jean-Pierre Sabar)
1990 : "Quand j'serai KO" (lyrics/composer/performer: Alain Souchon)
1991 : "Fais-moi une place" (composer/performer: Julien Clerc - lyrics: Françoise Hardy)
1992 : "Un homme heureux" (lyrics/composer/performer: William Sheller)
1993 : "Le Chat" by Pow woW
1994 : "Foule sentimentale" (lyrics/composer/performer: Alain Souchon)
1995 : "Juste quelqu'un de bien" by Enzo Enzo (lyrics/composer/: Kent Cockenstock - arranger : François Bréant)
1996 : "Pour que tu m'aimes encore" by Céline Dion (lyrics/composer: Jean-Jacques Goldman - arrangers: Jean-Jacques Goldman et Erick Benzi)
1997 : "Aïcha" by Khaled (lyrics, composer: Jean-Jacques Goldman)
1998 : "L'Homme pressé" by Noir Désir (lyrics/composer: Bertrand Cantat / Noir Désir - arranger : Andy Baker)
1999 : "Belle" from Notre Dame de Paris (sung by Garou, Daniel Lavoie and Patrick Fiori - lyrics: Luc Plamondon - composer: Richard Cocciante)
2000 : "Tomber la chemise" by Zebda (lyrics: Magyd Cherfi - composer: Zebda)

Original Song of the Year
2001 : "L'envie d'aimer" by Daniel Lévi (lyrics: Lionel Florence and Patrice Guirao - composer: Pascal Obispo - arranger: Nick Ingman)
2002 : "Sous le vent" by Garou and Céline Dion (lyrics/composer: Jacques Veneruso - arrangers : Christophe Battaglia and Jacques Veneruso)
2003 : "Manhattan-Kaboul" by Renaud and Axelle Red (lyrics: Renaud - composer/arranger: Jean-Pierre Bucolo)
2004 : "Respire" by Mickey 3D (lyrics: Mickaël Furnon - composers: Najah El Mahmoud / Mickaël Furnon / Aurélien Joanin)
2005 : "Si seulement je pouvais lui manquer" by Calogero (lyrics: Michel Jourdan / Julie Daime, composers: Calogero/Gioacchino Maurici)
2006 : "Caravane" by Raphaël (lyrics/composer: Raphael)
2007 : "Le dîner" by Bénabar (lyrics/composer: Bénabar) 
2008 : "Double je" by Christophe Willem (lyrics: Zazie,  composers: Zazie / Jean-Pierre Pilot / Olivier Schultheis)
2009 : "Comme un manouche sans guitare" by Thomas Dutronc (lyrics: Thomas Dutronc, composer: Thomas Dutronc)
2010 : "Comme des enfants" by Cœur de pirate (lyrics: Cœur de pirate, composer: Cœur de pirate)
2011 : "Je veux" by Zaz (lyrics: Kerredine Soltani, composers: Kerredine Soltani / Tryss)
2012 : "Jeanne" by Laurent Voulzy  (lyrics: Alain Souchon - composer: Laurent Voulzy)
2013 : "Allez allez allez" by Camille (lyrics/composer: Camille)
2014 : "20 ans" by Johnny Hallyday (lyrics: Christophe Miossec - composer: David Ford)
2015 : "Un jour au mauvais endroit" by Calogero (lyrics:Marie Bastide - composer: Calogero)
2016 :  "Sapés comme jamais" by Maître Gims (lyrics/composers: Maître Gims, Niska, Dany Synthé)
2017 : "Je m'en vais" by Vianney (lyrics/composer Vianney)
2018 : "Dommage" by Bigflo & Oli (lyrics: Bigflo & Oli, Paul Van Haver - composers: Bigflo & Oli, Stromae)
2019 : "Je me dis que toi aussi" by Boulevard des airs

Musical Show and Concert of the Year
Musical Show
1985 : Julien Clerc at Bercy
1986 : Jean Michel Jarre in Houston
1987 : Cabaret directed by Jérôme Savary at the Théâtre Mogador
1988 : La Fabuleuse Histoire de Mister Swing by Michel Jonasz
1992 : Les Misérables  by Alain Boublil et Claude-Michel Schönberg in the Théâtre Mogador
1993 : Cérémonie d'ouverture et de clôture des Jeux Olympiques d'hiver à Albertville (choreography : Philippe Decouflé)
1994 : Starmania at the Théâtre Mogador
1996 : Les Poubelle Boys at the Paris Olympia

Concert of the Year
1990 : Francis Cabrel at the Zénith
1991 : Johnny Hallyday in Bercy
1992 : Eddy Mitchell at the Casino de Paris
1993 : Jacques Dutronc in the Casino de Paris
1994 : Johnny Hallyday at the Parc des Princes
1995 : Eddy Mitchell in Bercy, at the Casino de Paris, at the Paris Olympia and at the Zénith
1996 : Johnny Hallyday in Bercy
1998 : Sol En Si in Casino de Paris

Musical Show, Tour or Concert of the Year
1999 : Notre Dame de Paris at the Casino de Paris
2000 : Je dis aime by -M- at l'Elysée Montmartre and on tour
2001 : Johnny Hallyday at the Eiffel Tower, at the Paris Olympia and on tour
2002 : Henri Salvador at the Paris Olympia
2003 : Christophe at the Paris Olympia
2004 : Fan en tournée by Pascal Obispo
2005 : -M- at the Olympia and on tour
2006 : Zazie Rodéo tour at Bercy and on tour
2007 : Olivia Ruiz
2008 : Michel Polnareff - Ze Tour 2007
2009 : Alain Bashung - Bleu pétrole tour
2010 : Johnny Hallyday - Tour 66
2013 : Shaka Ponk at the Olympia, Le Zénith and Bataclan - The Geeks Tour (Production: Zouave Spectacles)
2014 : -M- - Îl(s)
2015 : Stromae - Racine carrée Tour
2016 : Christine and the Queens - Zéniths Tour
2017 : Ibrahim Maalouf - Red and Black Light
2018 : Camille - Tour
2019 : Orelsan - Tour

Music Video of the Year
1985 : "Pull Marine" by Isabelle Adjani (Director: Luc Besson)
1986 : "La Ballade de Jim" by Alain Souchon (Director: Philippe Bensoussan)
1987 : "C'est comme ça " by Rita Mitsouko (Director: Jean-Baptiste Mondino)
1988 : "Là-bas" by Jean-Jacques Goldman (Director: Bernard Schmitt)
1990 : "Casser la voix" by Patrick Bruel (Directors: Joëlle Bouvier and Régis Obadia)
1991 : "Tandem" by Vanessa Paradis (Director: Jean-Baptiste Mondino)
1992 : "Auteuil, Neuilly, Passy" by Les Inconnus (Directors: Gérard Pullicino and les Inconnus)
1993 : "Osez Joséphine" by Alain Bashung (Director: Jean-Baptiste Mondino)
1994 : "L'Ennemi dans la glace" by Alain Chamfort (Director: Jean-Baptiste Mondino)
1995 : "Nouveau Western" by MC Solaar (Director: Stéphane Sednaoui)
1996 : "Larsen" by Zazie (Director: Philippe Andre)
1997 : "C'est ça la France" by Marc Lavoine (Director: Sylvain Bergère)
1998 : "Savoir aimer" by Florent Pagny (Director: Sylvain Bergère)
1999 : "La nuit je mens " by Alain Bashung (Director: Jacques Audiard)
2000 : "Flat Beat" by Mr. Oizo (Director: Quentin Dupieux)
2001 : "Am I Wrong by Étienne de Crécy (Director: Geoffrey de Crécy)
2002 : "Le vent nous portera" by Noir Désir (Director: Alexandre Courtes and Jacques Veneruso)
2003 : "Tournent les violons" by Jean-Jacques Goldman (Director: Yannick Saillet)
2004 : "Respire" by Mickey 3D
2005 : "Les beaux yeux de Laure" by Alain Chamfort (Director: Bruno Decharme)
2006 : "Est-ce que tu aimes ?" by Arthur H and -M-
2007 : "Marly-Gomont" by Kamini
2008 : "1234" by Feist
2009 : "Les limites" by Julien Doré (Directors: Fabrice Laffont et Julien Doré)
2010 : "Elle panique" by Olivia Ruiz (Director: Valérie Pierson)
2011 : "La Banane" by Philippe Katerine (Director: Gaëtan Chataigner)
2012 : "La Seine" by Vanessa Paradis and -M- (Director: Bibo Bergeron)
2013 : "FUYA" by C2C (Directors: Sylvain Richard and Francis Cutter)
2014 : "Formidable" by Stromae (Director: Jérôme Guillot)
2015 : "Saint Claude" by Christine and the Queens (Director: J.A.C.K.)
2016 : "Christine" by Christine and the Queens (Director: J.A.C.K.) (second award)
2017 : "Makeba" by Jain
2018 : "Basique" by Orelsan
2019 : "Tout oublier' by Angèle (Directors: Brice VDH and Léo Walk)

Music DVD of the Year
2005 : Les leçons de musique by -M- (director: Emilie Chedid)
2006 : En images by Noir Désir (director: Don Kent)
2007 : Tryo fête ses dix ans by Tryo
2008 : Le Soldat Rose by Louis Chedid (director: Jean-Louis Cap)
2009 : Divinidylle by Vanessa Paradis (directors: Thierry Poiraud - Didier Poiraud)
2010 : Alain Bashung à l'Olympia by Alain Bashung (director: Fabien Raymond)
2014 : Geeks on Stage by Shaka Ponk

 Various awards Sound engineer1985 : Andy Scott for Julien Clerc at Bercy
1992 : Dominique Blanc-Francard for Seul dans ton coin of David McNeil and Amours secrètes... Passion publique of Julien Clerc
1993 : Patrice Cramer for Où est la source? of Michel JonaszAlbum producer1985 : Michel Jonasz, Kamil Rustam, Gabriel Yared, Manu Katché, Jean-Yves D'Angelo and Georges Rodi -  for Unis vers l'uni of Michel JonaszStudio musician1986 : Jannick Top
1987 : Manu Katché
1988 : Russell PowellProducer / Arranger1992 : Mick Lanaro for Si ce soir... of Patrick Bruel and Sheller en solitaire of William Sheller
1993 : Michel Cœuriot and Laurent Voulzy for Caché derrière of Laurent Voulzy
1994 : Dominique Blanc-FrancardShow producer1992 : Jean-Claude Camus
1993 : Gilbert Coullier
1994 : L'Olympia
1995 : Corida
1996 : Jules Frutos, Hélène Rol et Dominique RevertRecord covers1985 : William Klein for cover of Love on the Beat by Serge Gainsbourg 
1986 : Ennio Antonangeli, Silvana Fantino and Jeanne Mas for Femmes d'aujourd'hui by Jeanne Mas

 Comedian of the Year
1985 : Raymond Devos
1987 : Coluche
1990 : Les Inconnus
1991 : Les Inconnus (second award)
1992 : Smaïn
1993 : Guy Bedos and Muriel Robin
1994 : Patrick Timsit
1995 : Raymond Devos (second award)
1996 : Les Inconnus (third award)
1997 : Valérie Lemercier
1998 : Quator for the show Il pleut des cordes (as Humour show of the year)

 Honorary Award 
1990 : Serge Gainsbourg
1996 : Henri Salvador
2001 : Renaud
2003 : Serge Reggiani
2007 : Juliette Gréco and Michel Polnareff
2009 : Johnny Hallyday and Jean-Loup Dabadie
2010 : Charles Aznavour, Stevie Wonder and Hugues Aufray
2011 : Indochine
2013 : Véronique Sanson and Sheila

 Multiple awards 

 13 won Matthieu Chedid, Alain Bashung
 12 won Orelsan
 10 won Johnny Hallyday, Alain Souchon
 7 won Vanessa Paradis
 6 won Jean-Jacques Goldman, Patricia Kaas,Renaud, Zazie
 5 won Camille, Julien Clerc, Michel Jonasz, Eddy Mitchell, Noir Désir, MC Solaar, Stromae, Laurent Voulzy, Michel Sardou
 4 won Abd al Malik, Benjamin Biolay, C2C, Francis Cabrel, Christine and the Queens, Les Inconnus, Louise attaque, Jean-Baptiste Mondino, Olivia Ruiz, Henri Salvador, Éric Serra, William Sheller
 3 won'
 Air,  Angèle, Bénabar, Bigflo et Oli, Calogero, Patrick Bruel, Henri Dès, Céline Dion, Julien Doré, Mylène Farmer, Serge Gainsbourg, Arthur H, Les Innocents, Izïa, Jean-Michel Jarre, Manu Katché, Kyo, Daniel Lavoie, Jeanne Mas, Mickey 3D, Yael Naim, Raphael, Gaëtan Roussel, Véronique Sanson, Shaka Ponk, Émilie Simon, Rachid Taha

Notes

References

External links
  
  Les Victoires de la musique de 2011 (The 2011 Music’s Victories)

French music awards